Johanneberg Science Park was established in December 2009 by the Chalmers University of Technology Foundation and the City of Gothenburg to create better conditions for regional sustainable growth, based on the activities currently conducted within Chalmers University of Technology at Campus Johanneberg in Gothenburg, Sweden.

The Science Park primarily support development of activities within the disciplines of Urban Development, Environment, Energy, Materials and Nanoscience.

External links
www.johannebergsciencepark.com

Science parks in Sweden
Buildings and structures in Gothenburg
2009 establishments in Sweden
Chalmers University of Technology